Baniana is a genus of moths of the family Erebidae. The genus was previously classified in the subfamily Calpinae of the family Noctuidae.

Description
Palpi usually reaching vertex of head, where the third joint minute. Thorax and abdomen smoothly scaled. Forewings with slightly produced and falcate apex. Hindwings with vein 5 from above lower angle of cell.

Species
 Baniana arvorum (Guenée 1852)
 Baniana athamas Schaus 1914
 Baniana centrata Dognin 1912
 Baniana chelesema Hampson 1926
 Baniana cohaerens Draudt 1950
 Baniana craterosema Hampson 1926
 Baniana culminifera Hampson 1910
 Baniana disticta Hampson 1926
 Baniana firmalis (Guenée, 1854)
 Baniana fulvia Druce 1898
 Baniana gobar Druce, in Godman and Salvin, 1898
 Baniana gulussa Schaus 1914
 Baniana gyas Schaus 1914
 Baniana haga Schaus, 1912
 Baniana helicon Druce 1898
 Baniana helle Schaus 1914
 Baniana herceus Schaus 1914
 Baniana inaequalis Walker, 1862 (synonym: Baniana crucilla (Schaus, 1914))
 Baniana lodebar Dyar 1916
 Baniana mademalis (Viette, 1978)
 Baniana mexicana Walker 1865
 Baniana minor Lafontaine & Walsh, 2010
 Baniana nephele Schaus 1914
 Baniana ochracea Hampson 1926
 Baniana octomaculata (Holland 1894)
 Baniana omoptila Viette 1956
 Baniana ostia Druce 1898
 Baniana pastoria Schaus 1911
 Baniana phaleniforma Dognin 1912
 Baniana phruxus Schaus 1914
 Baniana pulverulenta Hampson 1926
 Baniana punctifera Dognin 1912
 Baniana quadrimaculata (Holland 1894)
 Baniana relapsa Walker, 1858
 Baniana retrorsa Hampson 1926
 Baniana semilugens (Walker 1858)
 Baniana serpens Schaus 1914
 Baniana sexmaculata (Holland 1894)
 Baniana significans Walker, 1858
 Baniana sminthochroa Hampson 1926
 Baniana strigata Schaus 1911
 Baniana suggesta (Walker 1858)
 Baniana tincticollis (Walker 1858)
 Baniana triangulifera Dognin 1912
 Baniana trigrammos (Mabille 1881)
 Baniana veluta Schaus, 1901
 Baniana veluticollis Hampson 1898
 Baniana ypita Schaus, 1901

References
 
 

Anobinae
Moth genera